Gemmuloborsonia is a genus of sea snails, marine gastropod mollusks in the family Turridae.

Description
This genus was previously provisionally included in the family Clavatulidae as the characters of the shell and the radula of this genus resemble more the characters of this family than those of the family Horaiclavidae. However, it differs from the other genera in this family by its weak columellar pleats and the multispiral protoconch in the Recent specie. However the extinct species type has a paucispiral, globose and almost smooth protoconch. This must then be considered an apomorphic character state.

The fusiform shell is moderately small. The spire is relatively high and the base is contracted. The spire shows a peripheral cord with gemmules. The anal sinus is deep and its crest reaches the peripheral cord. The distinct columellar pleat is blunt.

Distribution
Originally only known as a fossil from the Upper Miocene-Lower Pleistocene of the Tethys Ocean and found in the Philippines, bathyal Recent species from New Caledonia, Indonesia, the Mozambique Channel, and the Philippines have been discovered. The genus appears to be rather widely distributed through the Indo-Pacific

Species
Species within the genus Gemmuloborsonia include:
 Gemmuloborsonia clandestina Puillandre, Cruaud & Kantor, 2009
 Gemmuloborsonia colorata (Sysoev & Bouchet, 2001)
 Gemmuloborsonia didyma Sysoev & Bouchet, 1996
 † Gemmuloborsonia fierstinei Shuto, 1989
 Gemmuloborsonia jarrigei Sysoev & Bouchet, 2001
 Gemmuloborsonia karubar Sysoev & Bouchet, 1996
 Gemmuloborsonia moosai Sysoev & Bouchet, 1996
 Gemmuloborsonia neocaledonica Sysoev & Bouchet, 1996

References

 Shuto, Tsugio. "Gemmuloborsonia, a new genus of the family Turridae (Gastropoda) from the Plio-Pleistocene Cabatuan Formation, northwest Luzon." Nihon Koseibutsu Gakkai hokoku, kiji 153 (1989): 48-54
 Puillandre N., Cruaud C. & Kantor Y.I. (2010). Cryptic species in Gemmuloborsonia (Gastropoda: Conoidea). Journal of Molluscan Studies, 76(1):11-23

External links
 Sysoev, Alexander, and Philippe Bouchet. "Taxonomic reevaluation of Gemmuloborsonia Shuto, 1989 (Gastropoda: Conoidea), with a description of new Recent deep-water species." Journal of Molluscan Studies 62.1 (1996): 75-87
 Puillandre, N., C. Cruaud, and Yu I. Kantor. "Cryptic species in Gemmuloborsonia (Gastropoda: Conoidea)." Journal of Molluscan Studies 76.1 (2010): 11-23.
 Abdelkrim J., Aznar-Cormano L., Fedosov A., Kantor Y., Lozouet P., Phuong M., Zaharias P. & Puillandre N. (2018). Exon-capture based phylogeny and diversification of the venomous gastropods (Neogastropoda, Conoidea). Molecular Biology and Evolution. 35(10): 2355-2374